Interlachen may refer to some places in the United States:

Interlachen, Florida
Interlachen, Oregon
Interlachen Country Club in Edina, Minnesota

See also
Interlaken